The 2010 NCAA men's volleyball tournament was the 41st annual tournament to determine the national champion of NCAA men's collegiate indoor volleyball. The single elimination tournament was played at Maples Pavilion in Stanford, California during May 2010.

Stanford defeated Penn State in the final match, 3–0 (30–25, 30–20, 30–18), to win their second national title. The Cardinal (24–6) were coached by John Kosty.

Stanford's Brad Lawson and Kawika Shoji were named the tournament's Most Outstanding Players. Lawson and Shoji, along with five other players, comprised the All Tournament Team.

Qualification
Until the creation of the NCAA Men's Division III Volleyball Championship in 2012, there was only a single national championship for men's volleyball. As such, all NCAA men's volleyball programs, whether from Division I, Division II, or Division III, were eligible. A total of 4 teams were invited to contest this championship.

Tournament bracket 
Site: Maples Pavilion, Stanford, California

All tournament team 
Brad Lawson, Stanford (Co-Most outstanding player)
Kawika Shoji, Stanford (Co-Most outstanding player)
Max Lipsitz, Penn State
Will Price, Penn State
Evan Romero, Stanford
Erik Shoji, Stanford
Joe Sunder, Penn State

See also 
 NCAA Men's National Collegiate Volleyball Championship
 NCAA Women's Volleyball Championships (Division I, Division II, Division III)

References

2010
NCAA Men's Volleyball Championship
NCAA Men's Volleyball Championship
2010 in sports in California
Volleyball in California